Endre Grastyán (February 25, 1924 in Oriszentpeter – June 17, 1988 in Pécs) was a Hungarian medical doctor, physiologist, professor, and member of the  Hungarian Academy of Sciences. He was a groundbreaking researcher in physiology, studying under Kalman Lissak. His students include György Buzsáki.

References

1924 births
1988 deaths
Hungarian neuroscientists